The Cambodia national rugby union team, nicknamed the Koupreys, represents Cambodia in the sport of rugby union. The national team is administered by the Rugby union in Cambodia, which is part of the Asian Rugby Football Union and an associate member of the International Rugby Board.

The Koupreys currently compete in Division IV of the annual Asian Five Nations. Cambodia has yet to make their debut at the Rugby World Cup.

References

External links
  Rugby Rising in popularity in Cambodia. 
 Cambodia on IRB.com
 Cambodia on rugbydata.com
 Rugby Cambodia

Asian national rugby union teams
Rugby union in Cambodia
National sports teams of Cambodia